Stylifera is a genus of silverfish in the family Lepismatidae. There are at least two described species in Stylifera.

Species
These two species belong to the genus Stylifera:
 Stylifera gigantea (Escherich, 1905)
 Stylifera impudica (Escherich, 1905)

References

Further reading

 
 

Lepismatidae
Articles created by Qbugbot